Laser Quest is a British indoor laser tag franchise founded in Manchester, United Kingdom in 1989. Its laser tag games use infrared (IR) hand-held units and vests. Laser Quest's oldest centre is located in Stourbridge, West Midlands, England.

In 1993, Laser Quest had begun operations in North America, where it would operate several locations in the United States and Canada. Its headquarters was located in Mississauga, Ontario. However, in September 2020, due to the COVID-19 pandemic, Laser Quest announced they had ceased operations in North America due to the uncertain economic environment.

Overview of the game of Laser Quest 
The player's goal in Laser Quest is to tag opponents as many times as possible, while avoiding being tagged. The players are equipped with an infrared/laser hand held unit and a pack with infrared sensors. Players start the game in a large multi-level maze-like arena filled with ramps, catwalks and windows. In Laser Quest centres, the playing arenas are filled with theatrical fog and black light, strobes and UV-reactive painted surfaces. While play can seem chaotic, there are rules that are enforced. Players recite a "Player's Code" in the Briefing Room, where they go to learn how to play the game. The Player's Code includes a vow not to run, climb, jump, sit, kneel, lie down, cover any sensors, make physical contact with other players, use offensive language, and to 'play hard, play smart, and play to survive!'. At least one employee or "Marshal" is present in the arena at all times, to ensure fair and safe game play and to make sure people enjoy their time.

Equipment 

Every LQ centre is equipped with approximately 30 packs, also called vests or ponchos. This number varies with busier arenas having more packs to accommodate larger crowds. The pack is made of a thick canvas-type material that hangs over the shoulders. When laid out flat on a table the vest forms a diamond shape. Sensors placed on various parts of the vest covering the chest, the back, and each shoulder. "There are additional sensors housed within the hand-held 'laser' unit located at the front, and both sides of the laser."
The sensor on the chest’s housing is also home to a small motor, that vibrates when the player has been hit.

The infrared sensors are attached to printed circuit boards, which include several colours of LEDs, often red and green or red and blue, that light up when the pack is active. Each PCB is housed in a hard plastic cover. Part of each cover is made from clear plastic to allow the IR beams to reach the sensors.

Inside the laser shell is the PCB with sensors and lights, a speaker to indicate the status of the pack, a trigger, and an LCD to display the status of the pack to the player.  The IR unit is what emits the visible laser the eye sees and the invisible IR beam which "tags" the opponent's packs.

The laser has a display in the rear.  When a player is tagged, it displays the codename of the tagger and the location of the tag. It also occasionally displays the player's current ranking as the game progresses.

Scoring
Laser Quest players gain points by tagging other players or by tagging the opposing team's base. They lose points when they are tagged by other players, or when they are caught in a trap. The number of points lost depends on where the player hit and game settings. The scale for a typical game is as follows:

 Shoulders: 3 points
 Laser: 3 points
 Back: 4 points
 Front: 5 points

Players always gain more points for making a tag than they lose for being tagged. In a standardized game, a player gains ten points when tagging another, and loses points corresponding to the above scale when tagged.

Players may also be awarded bonus points based on their accuracy—usually 10 points for every 1% hit rate. Players achieving a hit rate of 10% are awarded 100 bonus points. In a standard 'Solo' game, this bonus is limited to a maximum of 100 points, far less than the theoretical maximum of 1000 points awarded to a 100% accuracy. This prevents players tagging one person with their first tag and then hiding for the rest of the game.  As it is possible to tag multiple players with one tag, it is possible for a player's accuracy ratio to exceed 100%.

In team games, the team score is the sum of all similarly colored players' individual scores.

Game variants
The hardware and software used limit what types of games a Laser Quest center can hold. Up to four different groups of settings can be created; it is normal for everyone on a team to have the same settings, though this is not required. When giving packs within a team different settings, the packs will not be visibly different in-game, with the exception of 'sentinel' packs that have the ability to give lives and ammunition to teammates.  These packs are identified by an alternate light pattern on the front and back sensor.

The settings which can be altered are:

The number of shots used can be quite large; in certain game types, players routinely fire 3000+ shots. This will give an accuracy rate of perhaps 5%. This seemingly low amount is a result of constant firing and dodging, as players are not directly penalized for missed shots. The average is 6% ratio of accuracy.

Downtime is defined as the period of time after a player is tagged that they remain deactivated. After the downtime has expired, the de-activated player's pack will re-energise and they are able to play as before.

Cheating
Although all players are required to recite a code of conduct before play, some may still cheat. One of the main ways in which players cheat is by taking duct tape into the arena and placing it over the sensors. Although duct tape does not completely stop the sensor from getting tagged, it does make the play difficult. Most cheating is stopped by the marshal instantly and will have the player ejected from the game for that type of behaviour. Laser pointers do not work as the hit is determined by the IR beam and not the laser beam. Another way is what players call 'Spocking', when players makes a 'V' shape with their hands and blocks the sensor on the end of the laser.

World Laser Quest Challenge/Championship (WLC)

This tournament occurs every couple of years where teams and players from the US, Canada, the Netherlands, France, and the UK compete to be the best in the world. The WLC alternates between participating countries.

WLC Champions 

This tournament is often held irregularly dependant on player interest.
The current format of the tournament is 6-man teams compete in quad or triple quest prelim games, then depending on their prelim rank they will either play the cup or plate knockouts which are pack-set double/triple quest games. The top teams in the cup and the plate will then go onto the finals which are pack-set double-quest games.

The next WLC will be held in Europe in either 2021 or 2022. Due to the closure of every Laser Quest centre in North America the next one could be the last.

North America Challenge (NAC)

Laser Quest used to hold a corporate tournament called the North America Challenge, or NAC. To qualify for NAC, members from a particular centre hold a series of try-outs. The top nine players, plus one potential alternate, then go to one of three regional tournaments held in June of each year. The top teams from each of these regional tournaments will then proceed to the continental tournament, typically held in September. The top teams from each regional tournaments compete in the national event to determine the best team in Laser Quest.

Beginning in 1999, and continuing until 2007, the top five teams from each of the four North American regions advanced.  Following a series of centre closures, and new centres opening, regional lines were redrawn and three regions formed.

Changed again in 2010, each centre did not have a tryout, and teams were able to form their own homegrown teams, with 8 starters, and 1 extra for an alternate.

NAC Champions and Runners Up

European Laser Quest Championship (ELC)
This 9-man constructed team tournament consists of players from UK, France and the Netherlands. The tournament is held annually, with the location alternating amongst participating countries. The current format of the tournament is 6-man teams compete in triple-quest prelim games, then depending on their prelim rank they will either play the cup or plate knockouts which are pack-set double/triple quest games. The top teams in the cup and the plate will then go onto the finals which are pack-set double-quest games.

ELC Results 

Currently, 14 European Championships have taken place. France currently holds 7 European titles. The UK holds 5 European titles. The Netherlands holds 2 European titles. France are the current European Champions. However, The Tribe Called Quest hold the most titles.

References

External links
The Laser Quest site
LQ arena LQ forum
Laser tag wiki

Laser tag
Privately held companies of Canada